Sahej Bakshi (born 1987), better known by the stage name Dualist Inquiry, is a musician, guitarist, record producer and electronic music composer, who is among a handful of Indian composers working in the EDM genre. In 2017, Bakshi was included in the Forbes 30 Under 30 list by Forbes India.

Education
Bakshi attended The Doon School in Dehradun. He then received a scholarship in 2005 to pursue a bachelor's degree in music at the Thornton School of Music, University of Southern California. He then took a course in filmmaking at the Film and TV School of the Academy of Performing Arts in Prague.

Career
Bakshi began his career in 2010 by joining the alt rock band 'The Pulp Society', fronted by Imaad Shah. In 2011, he played at The Great Escape Festival as an opening act for Beardyman and DJ Shadow. Bakshi released his debut EP album Dualism in 2011. He released his second album Natural Disasters in 2014. After a three-year hiatus, he released Life Forms in 2019.

References

External links
 Rolling Stones profile

1987 births
Indian musicians
Living people
Indian electronic musicians
Indian record producers
Indian guitarists
Indian male musicians
Indian DJs
Musicians from Delhi
USC Thornton School of Music alumni
The Doon School alumni